Joseph George McParlane (also spelled McFarlane and McPharlane; 13 August 1885 – 29 May 1967), known as Joe Valli, was a Scottish-Australian actor who worked in vaudeville and films. He had a long-running vaudeville partnership with Pat Hanna as "Chic and Joe".

Valli was born in Glasgow, the son of engineer Joseph McParlane and Agnes Gill. He worked as an builder and engineer before working in entertainment. He died in Waterloo, New South Wales, of myocardial degeneration .

Selected filmography
 Diggers (1931)
 Waltzing Matilda (1933)
 Diggers in Blighty (1933)
 Heritage (1935)
 The Flying Doctor (1936)
 Orphan of the Wilderness (1936)
 Tall Timbers (1937)
 Let George Do It (1938)
 Typhoon Treasure (1938)
 Dad Rudd, MP (1940)
 Forty Thousand Horsemen (1940)
 Racing Luck (1941)
 The Power and the Glory (1941)
 The Rats of Tobruk (1944)
 Harvest Gold (1945)
 Smithy (1946)

References

External links
 

1880s births
1967 deaths
Male actors from Glasgow
Scottish emigrants to Australia
Australian male film actors
Vaudeville performers